Nii Amugi II is the official title of Simon Nii Yarboi Yartey (8 June 1940 – 10 December 2004), who was the Ga Mantse  in Ga for 39 years.

Biography
Amugi was the sixth child of his father Samuel Nii Ofoli Yartey and the second of mother, Elizabeth Naa Afi Torgbor of Amugi We and Sakumo Tsoshishi respectively. As a student in 1946, he attended Methodist primary school at Kojokrom in the Western Region of Ghana, continuing at Nsawam ECM. He had 8 children, with wife Josephine Yartey.

Death
Nii Amugi II died after a long struggle with ill health. His funeral was attended by former president of Ghana, Jerry John Rawlings, as well as Professor John Atta-Mills, the NDC Presidential candidate for the 2008 general elections, Mr. Edward Doe Adjaho, Deputy Minority leader and Dr. Mary Grant.

References

External links
 Short Bio of Nii Amugi II
 Boni Nii Amugi II Laid to Rest
 Trouble looms to find new King after death of Nii Amugi II

1940 births
2004 deaths
Ghanaian royalty

Ga-Adangbe people